Siddi is a comune (municipality) in the Province of South Sardinia in the Italian region Sardinia, located about  northwest of Cagliari and about  north of Sanluri in the Marmilla historical sub-region.

Siddi borders the following municipalities: Baressa, Collinas, Gonnoscodina, Gonnostramatza, Lunamatrona, Pauli Arbarei, Ussaramanna. It is home to several archaeological findings, including a domus de janas from the Ozieri culture, a Giants' tomb and several nuraghe villages.

References

Cities and towns in Sardinia